Minnaminnikootam (2008) is a Malayalam film directed by Kamal. It stars Narain, Jayasurya, Indrajith, Meera Jasmine, Roma, Samvrutha, Anoop Chandran and Radhika in the lead roles. The score and soundtrack is composed by Bijibal. The story of the film revolves around a group of youngsters working in an IT park.

Plot
Sidharth and his wife Mumthaz are two highly paid IT professionals who are trying to overcome the crisis of their love marriage. They have many friends. Manikkunju, Abhilash, Charulatha, Rose Mary and Kalyani. They visit Sidharthan's flat for unwinding after work and consider their home an escape from work stress. Some unusual things happen which change their lives.

Abhilash and Charu argue and fight. At the end of these simple fights, they come to the home of Sidhu and Momu to chill out. Charu was living a life that was surrounded only by her father from when she was 5 years old. A wedding meet between the families of Abhi and Charu causes Charu's father to start drinking after 15 years. This causes a major break up between Charu and Abhi. On a trip to Chennai, for Mani's and Rose's marriage and for Abhi's marriage with his father's friend's daughter, Charu runs away to Bangalore and later moves abroad.

The story returns from flashback when Charu leaves for Bangalore. The flashback started when Charu read an email from Kalyani informing about her marriage. Charu attends the marriage and there she meets the old members of her "Minnaminnikootam". However, none of them shows any friendship with her. She returns to the airport and Abhi comes and sits beside her. He asks for them to go for a drive and takes her to Sidhu's house where she is emotionally greeted by her friends and receives the message of surprise. Abhi was never going to marry anyone else. He was planning on marrying Charu even if he didn't have her permission. Finally friends unite and Abhi and Charu decide to get married.

Cast

Narain as Abhilash/Abhi
Jayasurya as Manikunju/Achayan
Indrajith as Sidhaarth/Siddhu
Meera Jasmine as Charulatha/Charu
Roma as Rosemary/Rose
Samvrutha as Mumtaz/Mummu
Anoop Chandran as Partha Saradhi/Paachan
Radhika as Kalyani/Kallu
Sai Kumar as Balan Menon, Charulatha's father
Janardhanan as Karaparamban, Charulatha's father's friend
Mamukkoya as Kunjikannan, Charulatha's father's friend
T. G. Ravi as Aalikka, Charulatha's father's friend
Balachandran Chullikkadu as Appukuttan Maash, Charulatha's father's friend
Manikuttan as Fraud Boy, minister's son
Deepak Menon as Minister's son's friend.
P. Sreekumar as Gopalan Menon, Abhilash's Father 
Ambika Mohan as Abhilash's mother

Soundtrack
The soundtrack features songs composed by Bijibal, with lyrics by Anil Panachooran.

 "We Are in Love" — Karthik, Vineeth Sreenivasan, Sayanora Philip, Soumya Ramakrishnan   
 "Mizhi Tammil" — Ranjith Govind, Swetha Mohan  
 "Mizhi Tammil" — Swetha Mohan  
 "Taara Jaalam" — Afsal, Sujatha, Ganesh Sundaram, Cicily, Rakhi R. Nath, Raghuram;  
 "Kadalolam" — Manjari
 "Minnaminnikoottam" — P. Jayachandran, Anitha (singer)

Reception 
The movie did great particularly among young audience.

Awards 
Kerala State Film Award for Best Dubbing Artist won Sreeja Ravi
Samvrutha Sunil won the Best Supporting Actress at Asianet Film Awards for this film in 2008.

References

External links

2008 films
2000s Malayalam-language films
Indian romantic drama films
Films directed by Kamal (director)